The Grassy Sprain Reservoir is a  storage reservoir in northern Yonkers, New York. It was completed in 1876 by the City of Yonkers as the city's main storage reservoir. The reservoir was formed by the Grassy Sprain Brook Dam which impounded the Sprain Brook River and Grassy Sprain River.

In 1919 the City of Yonkers, which at that time had about 100,000 residents, estimated that the reservoir capacity would supply the city for 85 days.

See also
List of reservoirs and dams in New York

References

Reservoirs in Westchester County, New York
Reservoirs in New York (state)
Geography of Yonkers, New York
Protected areas of Westchester County, New York
1876 establishments in New York (state)